Barlow Common is a village in Derbyshire, England, near Barlow and Chesterfield. It includes the hamlet of Crowhole, which contains several buildings surviving from the 18th and 19th centuries. These include a bridge, which still has its commemorative plaque stating that it was built in 1831.

See also
List of places in Derbyshire

External links
GENUKI website/Memorial Inscriptions from Barlow Common

Villages in Derbyshire
North East Derbyshire District